Hagop Sandaldjian (1931–1990) was an Egyptian-born Armenian American musician and microminiature sculptor, best known for his tiny art pieces, currently displayed at the Museum of Jurassic Technology in Los Angeles, California. Sandaldjian's creations included a carving of Mount Ararat on a grain of rice; a crucifix in which a minute golden figure of Jesus hangs upon a cross made from a bisected strand of Sandaldjian's own hair; and recreations of Disney figures (Snow White and the Seven Dwarfs or Mickey Mouse, for example) or historical figures (such as Napoleon or Pope John Paul II) presented in the eye or on the tip of a needle.

Sandaldjian was born in Alexandria, Egypt, and went to the Soviet Union to study music in Yerevan, Armenia and in Moscow. After graduating from the Ippolitov-Ivanov Music College in 1955, he became a violinist, and taught music at a conservatory in Yerevan.  In the early 1970s he learned about the art of microminiature from one of his students, Eduard Ghazaryan.  Sandaldjian emigrated to the United States in 1980, but was required to leave behind his first collection of 18 miniature works.  Over the next decade, he produced another 33 miniatures.

Working extremely slowly under a microscope, Sandaldjian employed self-made tools such as sharpened needles tipped with ruby or diamond dust, compiling his sculptures out of minuscule materials such as dust, lint, and hair.  Even among the few practitioners of microminiature art, Sandaldjian was unusual in that he painted his work, using a single sharpened strand of hair as a brush.  Sandaldjian would time his motions to come between his heartbeats, thus maximizing his control of his fingers.  Those who saw Sandaldjian at work said that they could not tell when his hands moved.

As recounted in Lawrence Weschler's book Mr. Wilson's Cabinet of Wonder, Museum of Jurassic Technology founder David Hildebrand Wilson learned about Sandaldjian from a museum visitor, and began visiting him at his home in Montebello, California.  Wilson, who described the artist as "a very calm man", eventually decided to give Sandaldjian a show at the museum, but when he called Sandaldjian to tell him, Wilson learned that the artist had died only 10 days earlier.  Weschler also relates that his initial doubts about  the veracity of the museum's Sandaldjian exhibit were allayed when he located Sandaldjian's son in Montebello, who confirmed details about how his father worked, and also told Wechsler about the tradition of microminiature art in Armenia.

Publications
The Eye of the Needle: The Unique World of Microminiatures of Hagop Sandaldjian, with an essay by Ralph Rugoff, Museum of Jurassic Technology, 1996, Los Angeles, California, USA. .

References

People from Alexandria
Egyptian emigrants to the United States
American people of Armenian descent
Egyptian people of Armenian descent
Microminiature sculptors
1931 births
1990 deaths
People from Montebello, California
20th-century sculptors
Armenian educators
Ethnic Armenian artists